Thyateira (also Thyatira) was the name of an ancient Greek city in Asia Minor, now the modern Turkish city of Akhisar ("white castle"), Manisa Province. The name is probably Lydian. It lies in the far west of Turkey, south of Istanbul and almost due east of Athens.

History
It was an ancient Greek city called Pelopia and Semiramis, before it was renamed to Thyateira (Θυάτειρα), during the Hellenistic era in 290 BC, by the King Seleucus I Nicator. He was at war with Lysimachus when he learned that his wife had given birth to a daughter. According to Stephanus of Byzantium, he called this city "Thuateira" from Greek θυγάτηρ, θυγατέρα (thugatēr, thugatera), meaning "daughter", although it is likely that it is an older, Lydian name. In classical times, Thyatira stood on the border between Lydia and Mysia. During the Roman era, (1st century AD), it was famous for its dyeing facilities and was a center of the purple cloth trade. Among the ancient ruins of the city, inscriptions have been found relating to the guild of dyers in the city.  Indeed, more guilds συντεχνία suntechuia (syndicate)
are known in Thyatira than any other contemporary city in the Roman province of Asia (inscriptions mention the following: wool-workers, linen-workers, makers of outer garments, dyers, leather-workers, tanners, potters, bakers, slave-dealers, and bronze-smiths).

In early Christian times, Thyateira was home to a significant Christian church, mentioned as one of the seven Churches of the Book of Revelation in the Book of Revelation. According to Revelation, a woman named Jezebel (who called herself a prophetess) taught and seduced the Christians of Thyateira to commit sexual immorality and to eat food sacrificed to idols. However, some commentators such as Benson and Doddridge have concluded that what is being here practised in Thyatira is the same apostasy promoted in Israel by Jezebel as mentioned in the Books of Kings and that use of her name here is a direct reference to such. Indeed, as Doddridge notes, "the resemblance appears so great" that, in his view, it is the "same heresy which is represented".

The Apostle Paul and Silas might have visited Thyateira during Paul's second or third journey, Acts 16:13-16. They visited several small unnamed towns in the general vicinity during the second journey. While in Philippi, Paul and Silas stayed with a woman named Lydia from Thyateira, who continued to help them even after they were jailed and released.

In 366, a battle fought near Thyateira saw the army of Roman emperor Valens defeat Roman usurper Procopius.

Notable people
Artemidorus of Thyateira was an ancient Greek Olympic winners of the Stadion race, in the 193rd Olympiad at 8 BC.

Nicander, also known as Nicander of Thyateira was an ancient Greek grammarian.

Lydia of Thyatira, businesswoman in the Acts of the Apostles chapter 16 verse 11–40.  She was the apostle Paul's first convert to Christianity in Europe.

Bishopric
The city was home to a Christian community from the apostolic period. The community continued until 1922, when the Orthodox Christian population was deported.

In 1922, the Ecumenical Patriarch of Constantinople appointed an exarch for Western and Central Europe with the title Archbishop of Thyateira. The current archbishop of Thyateira (since 2019) is Nikitas Lulias. The Archbishop of Thyateira resides in London and has pastoral responsibility for the Greek Orthodox Church in the United Kingdom, Ireland and Malta.

The see of Thyatira is also included, without archiepiscopal rank, in the Roman Catholic Church's list of titular sees.

See also
Archdiocese of Thyateira and Great Britain
List of archbishops of Thyateira and Great Britain

References

Greek colonies in Anatolia
Ancient Greek archaeological sites in Turkey
Populated places in ancient Lydia
Populated places in ancient Mysia
Roman sites in Turkey
Catholic titular sees in Asia
New Testament cities
History of Manisa Province